Justin Peter Rose,  (born 30 July 1980) is an English professional golfer who plays most of his golf on the PGA Tour, while keeping his membership on the European Tour. He won his first major championship at the 2013 U.S. Open at Merion Golf Club, becoming the first English player to win a major since Nick Faldo in 1996 and the first to win the U.S. Open since Tony Jacklin in 1970. At the 2016 Summer Olympics in Rio de Janeiro, Rose won gold at the men's individual tournament. With that victory, Rose joined Hall of Fame members Gary Player, David Graham, Hale Irwin and Bernhard Langer as one of only five golfers to win official tournaments on all six continents on which golf is played. Rose has also twice been runner-up at the Masters Tournament, in 2015 and 2017.

He first came to prominence when he pre-qualified as an amateur for the 1998 Open Championship.  There, he holed a dramatic shot from the rough at the final hole to finish in a tie for fourth place. He won the 2007 Order of Merit on the European Tour and was ranked in the World top ten between November 2007 and July 2008. In March 2012, Rose won his first World Golf Championship event at the WGC-Cadillac Championship and as a result, he re-entered the world top 10. After finishing second to Tiger Woods in the 2013 Arnold Palmer Invitational, he rose to a then career-high world ranking of 3rd. After the Open Championship in 2018 he rose to world number 2. Following a loss to Keegan Bradley in a sudden-death playoff in the 2018 BMW Championship, Rose climbed to World Number 1 in the Official World Golf Ranking. He won the 2018 FedEx Cup Playoffs and its US$10 million prize.

Biography

Early years
Rose was born in Johannesburg, South Africa, to English parents, Annie, and Ken (who died of cancer in 2003). The family moved to England when Rose was five, and he started to play golf at Tylney Park Golf Club. He then moved on to Southwood Golf Club, Hartley Wintney Golf Club, and finally North Hants Golf Club. All of these clubs were near his then home in Hook, Hampshire.

Early golf
Rose broke 70 for the first time at the age of 11 and was a plus three handicap by 14. He played in the Walker Cup in 1997 as a 17-year-old.

At the age of 17, Rose burst to worldwide prominence at 1998 Open Championship at Royal Birkdale. He holed a dramatic shot from the rough from about 50 yards for birdie on the 18th hole, to finish in a tie for fourth. He won the silver medal for the low amateur. The following day he turned professional.

Family
Rose married long-time girlfriend Kate Phillips, a former international gymnast, in December 2006. They have a house in Albany, New Providence in The Bahamas, and a riverside flat in the London suburb of Putney. Kate gave birth to their first child, a son, Leo, in February 2009. In January 2012, they had a daughter, Lottie.

Honours
Rose was appointed Member of the Order of the British Empire in the 2017 New Year Honours for services to golf.

In 2021, he was named as  the recipient of the PGA Tour's Payne Stewart Award for his character, sportsmanship and a commitment to charity.

Advocacy
Rose is an advocate of sustainable golf facilities and works as an ambassador to the STRI's Golf Environment Awards, hosting receptions for winners.

Professional career

After turning professional, Rose struggled badly in his early career. He missed the cut in his first 21 consecutive events, including the European Tour qualifying school in 1998. He earned his first European Tour card when he finished 4th at the qualifying school in 1999. The following season he failed to retain his card and had to revisit the qualifying school, where he finished 9th.

Despite his early career struggles, Rose's career soon began to take off and he became established on the European Tour. In 2001 he opened the season with consecutive second-place finishes in the country of his birth, South Africa. He went on to finish the year in top-40 on the Order of Merit. He won his first professional event, the Dunhill Championship in South Africa, in 2002, and followed this up with three further victories in that year. They included another win in South Africa at the Nashua Masters, a win on the Japanese Golf Tour at the Crowns Tournament, and then he won his second European Tour title at the Victor Chandler British Masters, edging out Ian Poulter in the final round.

In 2003, Rose reached number 33 in the Official World Golf Ranking. He earned enough money to claim his PGA Tour card as a non-member for 2004 after finishing with more money than the 125th ranked player on the money list. In 2004, he played mostly in America on the PGA Tour, while also maintaining his membership on the European Tour. He did not have a great year and slipped out of the top 50 in the world rankings; however, he kept his tour card after earning in excess of a million dollars.

His ranking continued to fall in early 2005, and in March he announced that he was quitting the European Tour and concentrating on playing on the PGA Tour. This had no apparent effect on his poor form, and by the middle of the year, he had fallen out of the World's top 100. In August of that year, he made an about-face by announcing his intention to return to the European Tour. Later the same week he had his best result of the year, leading the Buick Championship after three rounds before slipping to a third-place finish. A couple of further good results followed late in the 2005 season, and he maintained his status on the PGA Tour after all.

In September 2006 at the Canadian Open, Rose led a PGA Tour tournament going into the final round for the first time. But he slipped up with a final round 74 which moved him down the field. He went on to finish 2nd at the Valero Texas Open and finished 47th on the money list with US$1.629 million in prize money. In November 2006 he won the Australian Masters, to claim his first title for four years. His renewed consistency, including a top 5 finish at the 2007 Masters which had seen him surpass his previous best world ranking, by reaching number 26 on 8 April 2007.

Rose lost in a playoff at the 2007 BMW PGA Championship but moved into the top twenty of the World Rankings for the first time, and by October had reached a new career high of 12 and became the top-ranked British golfer. Rose won the European Tour Order of Merit title for 2007 in a thrilling climax to the season at the Volvo Masters, which he won in a playoff on 4 November. His new world ranking of number 7 made him the top-ranked European golfer for the first time, and he subsequently moved up to sixth in the rankings. Since the end of 2009, Canadian golf instructor Sean Foley coaches Rose.

In 2010, Rose had a third place at the Honda Classic, and then he broke through with a victory at the Memorial Tournament with a final round 66 to win by three strokes over Rickie Fowler. This was his first win on American soil. The next day, Rose had to try to qualify for the U.S. Open, along with runner-up Rickie Fowler. Neither qualified which raised questions about the qualifications of the U.S. Open. In his first tournament start since his win, at the Travelers Championship two weeks later, Rose led by three shots entering the final round, but fell away to a tie for ninth. His good form continued in the following week's tournament, however, where he led by four shots after three rounds and shot a final-round even par 70 to win his second PGA Tour event – the AT&T National.

In March 2011, Rose had a chance to add to his two PGA Tour titles won in 2010, when he entered the final round at the Transitions Championship with a one-stroke lead. However, he shot a three-over-par 74, which included four consecutive bogeys in the middle of the round, to finish five shots behind the champion Gary Woodland. In September 2011, Rose won the BMW Championship, the third of the four FedEx Cup playoff events at Cog Hill Golf & Country Club. This was his first title of the year and third career PGA Tour win. Rose entered the week on the playoff bubble at 34th in the standings, knowing that he needed a good finish to make the final event at East Lake Golf Club. The win elevated him to 3rd in the standings and the position of knowing that if he won the Tour Championship he would be the FedEx champion. A flawless round of 63 on the opening day helped Rose to build a four stroke advantage going into the final round, and even though there was a late wobble with a bogey at the par five 15th, Rose recovered and won by two strokes from John Senden. Rose did not enjoy the same success at the Tour Championship though, when a second round 75 ended his chances of winning. He finished the tournament in a tie for 20th place and 5th on the overall FedEx Cup Standings.

2012
In 2012, Rose won his first World Golf Championship event at the WGC-Cadillac Championship at Doral Golf Resort & Spa, when he finished one stroke ahead of American Bubba Watson. He entered the final round with a three-stroke deficit from Watson, but after a solid final day's play, he took a two-stroke advantage down the notoriously difficult par 4 18th finishing hole. He made bogey however after finding the right rough with his tee shot and could not get up and down from the back of the green. This left Watson requiring a birdie on the hardest hole on the course in the final group behind Rose. Watson hit a tremendous iron shot from the right hand rough to within ten feet, but could not make the resulting putt, leaving Rose to celebrate the biggest win of his career., As a result, Rose returned to the world's top ten, re-entering at number seven.

At the 2012 PGA Championship, Rose recorded his best ever performance in a major championship with a tie for 3rd finish. He shot a final round of 66 to jump 22 places up the leaderboard after three previous rounds of 69-79-70.

At the 2012 Ryder Cup, Rose played a major part in Team Europe's dramatic comeback against the United States, holing putts of 10, 35 and 12 feet on the final three holes to defeat Phil Mickelson 1-up in the singles and completing Europe's domination of the first five matches.

On 12 October 2012, Rose won the 8-man Turkish Airlines World Golf Final defeating Lee Westwood by a single stroke in the final. He also beat Tiger Woods by a stroke in the semi-final, after progressing from his group with a 100% record.

2013
On 25 March 2013, Rose finished second to Tiger Woods at the Arnold Palmer Invitational and rose to a career-high of third in the world rankings.

2013 U.S. Open
On 16 June 2013, Rose won his maiden major championship at the U.S. Open at Merion Golf Club by two strokes over Phil Mickelson and Jason Day. He became the first Englishman in 43 years to win the U.S. Open. He also ended a 17-year major drought for English golfers since Nick Faldo's win at the 1996 Masters.

Rose had entered the final round two strokes behind the leader Mickelson at one-over-par, after rounds of 71-69-71 during the first three days. He found himself further back after bogeys at the 3rd and 5th holes, sandwiching a birdie at the 4th. Successive birdies at the 6th and the 7th took him into a share of the lead. He misread his birdie putt at the 11th, which led to a bogey to fall back to one-over for the tournament, as simultaneously Mickelson was holing his second shot from the fairway at the 10th to move into the lead. However, Rose responded with birdies at the 12th and 13th, to get under-par for the tournament and into a one-shot lead once again. He could not get up and down from a greenside bunker on the 14th and a further bogey on the 16th dropped Rose back to level for the day, but Mickelson made two bogeys at the 13th and 15th to remain one shot behind Rose.

After a par at the 17th, Rose hit a 4-iron approach to the tough 18th hole, which resulted in a final par of the day to reach the clubhouse at one-over-par. Mickelson, needing a birdie at the last to tie Rose and force a playoff, blocked his drive and could not reach the green in two. In a last attempt, Mickelson ran his pitch shot from below the green up to the pin, but could not hole it, which meant that Rose had claimed his first major championship. Rose moved back up to world number three as a result, equaling his career high ranking.

2014
On 29 June 2014, Rose won the Quicken Loans National, beating Shawn Stefani at the first hole of a playoff, with both players having tied at 3 under par after 72 holes. Two weeks later, Rose won the Aberdeen Asset Management Scottish Open.

At the 2014 Ryder Cup held at the PGA Centenary Course at the Gleneagles Hotel, Rose emerged as the leading points-getter, amassing 4 points in a 3-0-2 performance, which aided Europe to a 16.5-11.5 victory over the United States of America, marking the 3rd time in a row that Europe claimed the cup and the 6th time out of the last 7 playings of the event.

2015
At the 2015 Masters Tournament, Rose finished in a tie for second with Phil Mickelson behind winner Jordan Spieth. Rose's 14-under 274 (as well as Mickelson's) was the lowest score by a runner-up in Masters history. He picked up his seventh PGA Tour win at the Zurich Classic of New Orleans in April and added his eighth European Tour win at the UBS Hong Kong Open in October, claiming a narrow 1 stroke triumph after battling Lucas Bjerregaard of Denmark head-to-head over the weekend.

2016
Rose publicly focused on the 2016 Olympics in Rio de Janeiro, where golf was returning as a full event for the first time since 1904 in St. Louis. On the opening day, he became the first ever player to make a hole-in-one in Olympic play after recording it on the 189-yard par-3 4th hole of Gil Hanse's new Olympic Course in Barra da Tijuca using a 7-iron. Described as having an inspiring effect on the rest of the Great Britain team, Rose later gave the golf ball from that hole-in-one to gymnast Nile Wilson, who would go on to win a bronze medal in the horizontal bar.

Rose went to the 18th hole on Sunday tied at −15 with playing partner Henrik Stenson of Sweden, who had just won the 2016 Open Championship at Royal Troon to become the first Scandinavian man to win a major. Rose then produced a backspin pitch that left him with a short birdie putt, which he converted to become the first golfer to win Olympic gold in 112 years, while Stenson underhit his approach and eventually three-putted for bogey and the silver medal. (American Matt Kuchar claimed the bronze medal after shooting 63 on Sunday.) Shortly thereafter, Rose brought his Olympic gold medal to The Barclays at Bethpage Black and wore it around his neck, on the suggestion of playing partner Phil Mickelson's caddy Jim "Bones" McKay and to cheers from the gallery, during his final putt.

In addition, Rose qualified for the European team at the 2016 Ryder Cup at Hazeltine National, marking his fourth Ryder Cup appearance.

2017
In April 2017, Rose shot opening rounds of 71–72 at the Masters to enter the weekend as one of only a handful of players under par. In the third round, he fired a five-under round of 67 to co-lead through 54 holes with Sergio García. His round consisted of seven birdies, which resulted in a 31 on the back nine to move into contention for his second major championship. Rose lost to García in a sudden-death playoff.

In October, Rose won his second World Golf Championship event, taking the WGC-HSBC Champions by two strokes. He was tied for fourth place, eight strokes behind leader Dustin Johnson after the third round. Rose shot 67 to Johnson's 77 in the final round to win by two strokes.

In November 2017, Rose won the Turkish Airlines Open, a Rolex Series event.

In December 2017, Rose won the Indonesian Masters, an Asian Tour event. With this win he became the third golfer, after Lee Westwood (2000) and Ernie Els (2005), to win events on all six of the International Federation of PGA Tours.

In December 2017, Rose was officially unveiled as the host of the 2018 British Masters, following on from Ian Poulter, Luke Donald, and Lee Westwood. He opted to take the event to Walton Heath.

2018

Rose won the Fort Worth Invitational in May 2018.

Rose tied for second with a score of six-under-par at the 2018 Open Championship. His cumulative score of twelve-under-par across all four 2018 major championships was the best amongst everyone who made the cut in all four tournaments.

In September 2018, Rose finished second at the Dell Technologies Championship and lost a playoff to Keegan Bradley at the BMW Championship. Those finishes moved Rose to World Number One in the Official World Golf Ranking. The next week, Rose finished T4 at the Tour Championship to win the season-long FedEx Cup and $10,000,000.

Rose was part of the winning European team at the 2018 Ryder Cup at Le Golf National outside of Paris, France.

On 4 November 2018, Rose defended his title at the Turkish Airlines Open in a playoff over Li Haotong. With the victory, Rose joined Jon Rahm and Alex Norén as multiple Rolex Series winners and represented the first successful title defence of his career. This victory returned Rose to World Number One and earned him $1,166,660. For the following three weeks, the World Number One ranking alternated between Rose and Brooks Koepka.  Koepka then kept the top ranking for the final six weeks of 2018, then Rose regained it to begin 2019.

2019
Rose moved back to World Number 1 in January 2019 and announced new sponsors. He changed from TaylorMade Golf to Honma in a 10-club deal. He also switched from Adidas to Bonobos for his clothing. The deal with Honma was cancelled by Rose in May 2020 after he fell from number one to number fourteen in the Official World Golf Ranking.  

On 27 January 2019, Rose won the Farmers Insurance Open at Torrey Pines Golf Course in La Jolla, California.

On 16 June 2019, Rose finished tied for 3rd at the U.S. Open at Pebble Beach Golf Links in Pebble Beach, California.

2023
In February, Rose ended a four-year winless streak when he won the AT&T Pebble Beach Pro-Am. He shot a final-round 66 to win by three shots ahead of Brendon Todd and Brandon Wu.

Amateur wins
1995 McGregor Trophy, Carris Trophy
1997 St Andrews Links Trophy
1998 Peter McEvoy Trophy

Professional wins (25)

PGA Tour wins (11)

PGA Tour playoff record (1–3)

European Tour wins (11)

1Co-sanctioned by the Sunshine Tour
2Co-sanctioned by the PGA Tour of Australasia
3Co-sanctioned by the Asian Tour
 
European Tour playoff record (2–2)

Japan Golf Tour wins (1)

Asian Tour wins (2)

1Co-sanctioned by the European Tour

Sunshine Tour wins (2)

1Co-sanctioned by the European Tour

Other wins (3)

Major championships

Wins (1)

Results timeline
Results not in chronological order in 2020.

LA = Low amateur
CUT = missed the half way cut
"T" indicates a tie for a place.
NT = No tournament due to COVID-19 pandemic

Summary

Most consecutive cuts made – 10 (2013 PGA – 2016 Masters)
Longest streak of top-10s – 3 (2015 Open – 2016 Masters)

Results in The Players Championship

CUT = missed the halfway cut
"T" indicates a tie for a place
C = Cancelled after the first round due to the COVID-19 pandemic

World Golf Championships

Wins (2)

Results timeline
Results not in chronological order before 2015.

1Cancelled due to COVID-19 pandemic

QF, R16, R32, R64 = Round in which player lost in match play
NT = No tournament
"T" = tied
Note that the HSBC Champions did not become a WGC event until 2009.
Note that the Championship and Invitational were discontinued from 2022.

Team appearances
Amateur
European Boys' Team Championship (representing England): 1996, 1997
European Amateur Team Championship (representing England): 1997
Walker Cup (representing Great Britain & Ireland): 1997
Jacques Léglise Trophy (representing Great Britain & Ireland): 1996, 1997
Bonallack Trophy (representing Europe): 1998 (winners)

Professional
World Cup (representing England): 2002, 2003, 2007, 2011
Seve Trophy (representing Great Britain & Ireland): 2003 (winners), 2007 (winners)
Ryder Cup (representing Europe): 2008, 2012 (winners), 2014 (winners), 2016, 2018 (winners)

See also
List of golfers with most PGA Tour wins
List of golfers with most European Tour wins
List of men's major championships winning golfers

References

External links

English male golfers
European Tour golfers
PGA Tour golfers
Winners of men's major golf championships
Ryder Cup competitors for Europe
Olympic golfers of Great Britain
Golfers at the 2016 Summer Olympics
Medalists at the 2016 Summer Olympics
Olympic gold medallists for Great Britain
Olympic medalists in golf
Members of the Order of the British Empire
English expatriates in the United States
Golfers from Johannesburg
People from Fleet, Hampshire
Sportspeople from London
Golfers from Orlando, Florida
1980 births
Living people